Malindi Myers (born 3 October 1970) is a British civil servant and former international rower.

Rowing career
Myers rowed for Durham University Boat Club while studying economics. After winning two golds at the 1996 National Championships in the coxless four and eights she was part of the British crew that won silver in the Lightweight Women's Coxless Four at the 1996 World Rowing Championships.

She won further medals at both the 1997 World Rowing Championships and the 1999 World Rowing Championships before becoming a World Champion at the 2000 World Rowing Championships, winning the Lightweight Women's Coxless Pair alongside Miriam Taylor.

Economist
Following a Masters in Environmental and Natural Resource Economics she joined HM Treasury as a junior economist after university, and later took time out to prepare for the 1996 World Rowing Championships.

After the 1996 World Championships she returned to the Civil Service and then to the European Commission on a secondment scheme. She secured a job with the Government Economic Service before joining the Office for National Statistics.

References

1970 births
Living people
English female rowers
English civil servants
Durham University Boat Club rowers
Alumni of Durham University
World Rowing Championships medalists for Great Britain